Monte Coman is a town and district in San Rafael Department, Mendoza Province, Argentina, located to the east of San Rafael city. The town has a football team called San Martín.

External links
 San Rafael government (Spanish)
 San Martin Football Club (Spanish)

Populated places in Mendoza Province